Sophie Sorschag (born 14 November 1998) is an Austrian-born naturalized Kosovan ski jumper.

Career
Sorschag played football in her youth and was a midfielder for SK Grafendorf/Obergailtal, before she switched to the ski jumpers. On 7 and 8 August 2016, she started for the first time in two competitions in Klingenthal in the Alpen Cup, where she finished 33rd and 29th. As a result, she started more times at Alpen Cups in Germany, Austria and Slovenia. On 24 and 25 February 2018, she also competed in the FIS Cup for the first time in Villach, where she finished 29th and 28th. On 19 and 20 January 2019, Sorschag made her debut in the Continental Cup in Planica, where she achieved a podium finish and Continental Cup points with a third and seventh place. In the end, she finished the season in eleventh place overall and sixth in the winter rankings.

In 2021, together with Daniela Iraschko-Stolz, Chiara Hölzl and Marita Kramer, she won the gold medal in the team race on the normal hill at the World Championships in Oberstdorf.

On 8 November 2022, Sorschag announced that he would no longer represent Austria because she had been excluded from the Austrian Ski Association in the summer. The Austrian Ski Association contradicted this saying Sorschag herself had submitted an application for a change of nation. On 19 January 2023, The Kosovo Ski Federation announced that Sorschag had decided to represent their country.

References

External links

1998 births
Living people
Sportspeople from Villach
21st-century Austrian women
Austrian female ski jumpers
FIS Nordic World Ski Championships medalists in ski jumping
Olympic ski jumpers of Austria
Ski jumpers at the 2022 Winter Olympics